The 2010–11 National League 1 is the second season of  the third division of the English domestic rugby union competitions since the professionalised format of the second division was introduced.  Coventry find themselves playing in this league following their relegation from the 2009-10 RFU Championship while teams coming up include Macclesfield (2009–10 National League 2 North), Barking and Rosslyn Park (both 2009–10 National League 2 South).

Despite losing three out of their first four games, London Scottish would go on to win the league title by winning twenty-six games on the trot and finishing ahead of newly promoted Barking.  They actually trailed Barking for most of the season, with a rearranged Christmas fixture meaning that they would face the Goresbrook-based side in the final game.  London Scottish won this game 17 - 13 to become the champions and seal promotion to the 2011–12 RFU Championship.  At the other end of the table relegated teams included Launceston (who were unable to overcome a 20-point deduction given at the start of the season due to going into voluntary liquidation), Otley and Redruth.  Launceston and Redruth would drop to the 2011–12 National League 2 South, with at least the consolation of having the Cornish derby for next season, while Otley dropped to the 2011–12 National League 2 North.

Participating teams and locations

League table
 Notes:

Results

Round 1

Round 2

Round 3

Round 4

Round 5

Round 6

Round 7

Round 8

Round 9

Round 10

Round 11

Round 12

Round 13 

Postponed.  Game rescheduled for 5 February 2011.

Postponed.  Game rescheduled for 5 February 2011.

Postponed.  Game rescheduled for 5 February 2011.

Postponed.  Game rescheduled for 5 February 2011.

Postponed.  Game rescheduled for 5 February 2011.

Postponed.  Game rescheduled for 5 February 2011.

Postponed.  Game rescheduled for 5 February 2011.

Round 14 

Postponed.  Game rescheduled for 26 February 2011. 

Postponed.  Game rescheduled for 26 February 2011. 

Postponed.  Game rescheduled for 26 February 2011. 

Postponed.  Game rescheduled for 26 February 2011. 

Postponed.  Game rescheduled for 26 February 2011. 

Postponed.  Game rescheduled for 26 February 2011. 

Postponed.  Game rescheduled for 26 February 2011. 

Postponed.  Game rescheduled for 26 February 2011.

Round 15 

Postponed.  Game rescheduled for 19 March 2011.

Postponed.  Game rescheduled for 19 March 2011.

Round 16 

Postponed.  Game rescheduled for 7 May 2011.

Postponed.  Game rescheduled for 7 May 2011.

Postponed.  Game rescheduled for 19 March 2011.

Postponed.  Game rescheduled for 19 March 2011.

Postponed.  Game rescheduled for 19 March 2011.

Postponed.  Game rescheduled for 7 May 2011.

Postponed.  Game rescheduled for 2 May 2011.

Round 17

Round 18

Round 19 

Postponed.  Game rescheduled to 14 May 2011.

Postponed.  Game rescheduled to 7 May 2011.

Postponed.  Game rescheduled to 12 April 2011.

Round 20 

Postponed.  Game rescheduled to 21 May 2011.

Round 13 (Rescheduled games) 

Rescheduled from 27 November 2010.

Rescheduled from 27 November 2010.

Rescheduled from 27 November 2010.

Rescheduled from 27 November 2010.

Rescheduled from 27 November 2010.

Rescheduled from 27 November 2010.

Rescheduled from 27 November 2010.

Round 21

Round 22

Round 14 (Rescheduled games) 

Rescheduled from 4 December 2010.

Rescheduled from 4 December 2010.

Rescheduled from 4 December 2010.

Rescheduled from 4 December 2010.

Rescheduled from 4 December 2010.

Rescheduled from 4 December 2010.

Rescheduled from 4 December 2010.

Rescheduled from 4 December 2010.

Round 23

Round 24

Rounds 15 & 16 (Rescheduled games) 

Rescheduled from 11 December 2010.

Rescheduled from 11 December 2010.

Rescheduled from 18 December 2010.

Rescheduled from 18 December 2010.

Rescheduled from 18 December 2010.

Round 25

Round 26

Round 27

Round 19 (Rescheduled game) 

Game rescheduled from 22 January 2011.

Round 28

Round 29

Round 30

Round 16 (Rescheduled game) 

Rescheduled from 18 December 2010.

Rounds 16 & 19 (Rescheduled games) 

Rescheduled from 18 December 2010.

Rescheduled from 18 December 2010.

Rescheduled from 22 January 2011.

Rescheduled from 18 December 2010.  As game would not affect league outcome it was cancelled.

Round 19 (Rescheduled game) 

Rescheduled from 22 January 2011.

Round 20 (Rescheduled game) 

Rescheduled from 29 January 2011.  As game would not affect league outcome it was cancelled.

Total Season Attendances

Individual statistics 

 Note if players are tied on tries or points the player with the lowest number of appearances will come first.  Also note that points scorers includes tries as well as conversions, penalties and drop goals.

Top points scorers

Top try scorers

Season records

Team
Largest home win — 68 pts
75 - 7 Barking at home to Sedgley Park on 16 April 2011
Largest away win — 37 pts
40 - 3 London Scottish away to Blaydon on 5 February 2011
Most points scored — 78
78 - 23 Cambridge at home to Sedgley Park on 30 April 2011
Most tries in a match — 12
Cambridge at home to Sedgley Park on 30 April 2011
Most conversions in a match — 9
Cambridge at home to Sedgley Park on 30 April 2011
Most penalties in a match — 5
N/A - multiple teams
Most drop goals in a match — 2
London Scottish away to Tynedale on 29 January 2011

Player
Most points in a match — 28
 Henry Staff for Barking at home to Sedgley Park on 16 April 2011
Most tries in a match — 4 (x3)
 James Stephenson for Blackheath at home to Otley on 25 September 2010
 Scott Shaw for Barking at home to Sedgley Park on 16 April 2011
 Jeff Gregson for Coventry at home to Tynedale on 30 April 2011
Most conversions in a match — 9
 Ben Spencer for Cambridge at home to Sedgley Park on 30 April 2011
Most penalties in a match —  5
N/A - multiple players
Most drop goals in a match —  2
 James Brown for London Scottish away to Tynedale on 29 January 2011

Attendances
Highest — 2,372 
Blackheath at home to London Scottish on 30 April 2011
Lowest — 142 
Barking at home to Launceston on 5 February 2011
Highest Average Attendance — 933
Redruth
Lowest Average Attendance — 211			
Barking

See also
 English Rugby Union Leagues
 English rugby union system
 Rugby union in England

References

External links
 NCA Rugby

National
National League 1 seasons